The 2004 NCAA Skiing Championships were contested at the Sugar Bowl Ski Resort in Truckee, California from March 10–13, 2004 as part of the 51st annual NCAA-sanctioned ski tournament to determine the individual and team national champions of men's and women's collegiate slalom and cross-country skiing in the United States.

New Mexico, coached by George Brooks, won the team championship, the Lobos' first co-ed title and first overall. It was New Mexico's first team NCAA championship in any sport.

Venue

This year's championships were contested at the Sugar Bowl Ski Resort in Truckee, California. The event was hosted by the University of Nevada, Reno.

These were the first NCAA championships hosted at Sugar Bowl and the second in the state of California (1962 and 2004).

Program

Men's events
 Cross country, 10 kilometer freestyle
 Cross country, 20 kilometer classical
 Slalom
 Giant slalom

Women's events
 Cross country, 5 kilometer freestyle
 Cross country, 15 kilometer classical
 Slalom
 Giant slalom

Team scoring

 DC – Defending champions
 Debut team appearance

See also
 List of NCAA skiing programs

References

2004 in sports in California
NCAA Skiing Championships
2004 in alpine skiing
2004 in cross-country skiing
NCAA Skiing Championships
College sports tournaments in California
Skiing in California